Vostok (Russian: Восток, translated as "East") was a family of rockets derived from the Soviet R-7 Semyorka ICBM and was designed for the human spaceflight programme. This family of rockets launched the first artificial satellite (Sputnik 1) and the first crewed spacecraft (Vostok) in human history. It was a subset of the R-7 family of rockets.

On March 18, 1980, a Vostok-2M rocket exploded on its launch pad at Plesetsk during a fueling operation, killing 48 people. An investigation into a similarbut avoidedaccident revealed that the substitution of lead-based for tin-based solder in hydrogen peroxide filters allowed the breakdown of the H2O2, thus causing the resultant explosion.

Variants 
The major versions of the rocket were:

 Luna 8K72 – used to launch the early Luna spacecraft
 Vostok-L 8K72 – Variant of the Luna, used to launch prototype Vostok spacecraft
 Vostok-K 8K72K – a refined version of the above. This was the version actually used for human spaceflight
 Vostok-2 8A92 – used for launching Zenit reconnaissance satellites throughout the 1960s
 Vostok-2M 8A92M – modified version for launching Meteor weather satellites into higher orbits.
 Soyuz/Vostok 11A110 – hybrid of Soyuz and Vostok rockets used as an interim for two launches

Vostok 8K72K 

First Stage — Block B, V, G, D (four strap-on boosters)
Gross mass: 43,300 kg
Empty mass: 3,710 kg
Thrust (vac): 4 x 99,000 kgf (971 kN) = 3.88 MN
Isp: 
Burn time: 118 s
Isp(sl): 
Diameter: 2.68 m
Span: 8.35 m
Length: 19.00 m
Propellants: Lox/Kerosene
Engines: 1 x RD-107-8D74-1959 per booster = 4
Second Stage — Block A (core stage)
Gross mass: 100,400 kg
Empty mass: 6,800 kg
Thrust (vac): 912 kN
Isp: 
Burn time: 301 s
Isp(sl): 
Diameter: 2.99 m
Length: 28.00 m
Propellants: Lox/Kerosene
Engine: 1 x RD-108-8D75-1959
Third Stage — Block E
Gross mass: 7,775 kg
Empty mass: 1,440 kg
Thrust (vac): 54.5 kN
Isp: 
Burn time: 365 s
Diameter: 2.56 m
Span: 2.56 m
Length: 2.84 m
Propellants: Lox/Kerosene
Engine: 1 x RD-0109

Gallery

See also 

Vostok 1
Vostok programme
Vostok spacecraft

1958 in spaceflight
1991 in spaceflight
Vostok program
Space launch vehicles of the Soviet Union
R-7 (rocket family)
Vehicles introduced in 1960